"Elephant" is a song by Australian psychedelic rock band Tame Impala, released on 26 July 2012 as the lead single from their second album Lonerism (2012).
The single features artwork from Australian artist Leif Podhajsky, who also created the artwork for Innerspeaker and the follow-up Lonerism.

"Elephant" was covered by children's music group the Wiggles for Australian youth broadcaster Triple J's Like a Version segment on 5 March 2021, which won the station's Hottest 100 of 2021.

Background
Kevin Parker explains that:  "Elephant" features a bluesier side of Tame Impala, heard more frequently on their self-titled extended play, as the song was written around that stage. Because it was written around that time, "Elephant" is "an anomaly on Lonerism. There are no other songs that have that bluesy riffing".

Speaking about the track in a retrospective interview with Beats 1 in 2019, Parker spoke of his surprise at how successful the track became. "I always thought it was a bit shallow, a bit cringe. But now I appreciate Elephant, because the character I'm singing about, from the loner's perspective... it's how I always envisioned big, egotistical people who would march around. It's kind of how a loner might see a jock - like an elephant." In this same interview, Parker added that his favourite Lonerism lyric is from Elephant: "He pulled the mirrors off his Cadillac / 'Cause he doesn't like it looking like he looks back".

Critical reception
Alicia Dennis from Zimbio called "Elephant" "the best psych-rock song ever written about a pompous jerk", while Nick Patch of the Times Colonist described it as a "distortion-drenched garage-rocker". It is also viewed as a "glam-rock gem" by the webzine PlayGround. Joe Levy from Rolling Stone stated that the song was "Tame Impala's 2012 alt-rock hit", describing the guitar riff as "gong-banging glam". Ian Cohen of Pitchfork gave the song the "Best New Track" accolade, praising its production and stating that it "splits wide open during its midsection for an expansive and lyrical guitar jam that these guys are doing better than just about anyone else right now." Nathan Reese of Refinery29 described the song as the group's "meaner, more immediate take on its garage-psych sound". He also commented that the song "with dueling keyboard and guitar solos that arrive midway through" resembles Pink Floyd's "Lucifer Sam", "channeled through the Stooges".

Awards
Appeared at No. 7 on Triple J's Hottest 100 for 2012.
Won Best Song at the EG Music Awards
Zane Lowe declared it the "Hottest Record in the World" for 26 July 2012.
The song won Song of the Year at the APRA Music Awards in 2013.
The video won Video of the Year at the 2013 West Australian Music Industry Awards.

Chart performance

Weekly charts

Year-end charts

Certifications

The Wiggles version

Australian children's music band the Wiggles performed a cover of "Elephant" for Australian youth broadcaster Triple J's Like a Version segment on 5 March 2021, during which they interpolated their original song "Fruit Salad" throughout the performance. The cover was later released as a single through ABC Music the following week, on 12 March 2021.

"Elephant" was included on the Wiggles' compilation album, ReWiggled (2022), which features the group performing covers of songs by various Australian artists.

The performing line-up included new and original Wiggles Lachy Gillespie, Anthony Field, Simon Pryce, Emma Watkins, Jeff Fatt, and Murray Cook.

The cover received instantaneous acclaim, with various people, including comedian Andy Lee, flagging it as a contender for the station's Hottest 100 countdown. It later emerged as a favourite to top the 2021 poll, which it ultimately won, becoming the first cover song to do so.

On 26 January 2022, Australian Recording Industry Association (ARIA) published their mid-week chart, in which they revealed the cover was likely to make its debut on the ARIA Top 50 Singles Chart that week. On 28 January, the song debuted at number 10 on the ARIA Singles Chart dated 31 January, becoming the Wiggles' first top fifty appearance in the process.

Charts

References

2012 singles
2012 songs
Tame Impala songs
Modular Recordings singles
Song recordings produced by Kevin Parker
Songs written by Kevin Parker (musician)
The Wiggles songs